Southern Lands is the debut album by Cetu Javu, released in 1990.

Track listing
All songs written by Chris Demere (music) and Javier Revilla-Diez (lyrics).

CD: GLX 20168-2
 "Southern Lands" – 4:14
 "Love Me" – 4:13
 "Oye" – 4:22
 "Words Without Thoughts" – 4:21
 "So Strange" – 3:58
 "Get It" – 4:59
 "Situations" – 4:01
 "Bad Dreams" – 3:46
 "Have in Mind" – 3:31
 "Quién Lo Sabía?" – 7:10
 "Fight Without a Reason" – 2:47
 "Adónde" – 3:58

LP: ZYX 20168-1
Side one
 "Southern Lands" – 4:14
 "Love Me" – 4:13
 "Oye" – 4:22
 "Words Without Thoughts" – 4:21
 "So Strange" – 3:58

Side two
 "Get It" – 4:59
 "Situations" – 4:01
 "Bad Dreams" – 3:46
 "Have in Mind" – 3:31
 "Quién Lo Sabía?" – 7:10

LP: BASICLP 021 (1990 Spanish pressing)
Side one
 "Southern Lands" – 4:14
 "Love Me" – 4:13
 "Oye" – 4:22
 "Words Without Thoughts" – 4:21
 "So Strange" – 3:58
 "Get It" – 4:59

Side two
 "Situations" – 4:01
 "Bad Dreams" – 3:46
 "Have in Mind" – 3:31
 "Quién Lo Sabía?" – 7:10
 "Fight Without a Reason" – 2:47
 "Adónde" – 3:58

CS: BASICAS 021
Side one
 "Southern Lands" – 4:14
 "Love Me" – 4:13
 "Oye" – 4:22
 "Words Without Thoughts" – 4:21
 "So Strange" – 3:58
 "Get It – 4:59

Side two
 "Situations" – 4:01
 "Bad Dreams" – 3:46
 "Have in Mind" – 3:31
 "Quién Lo Sabía?" – 7:10
 "Fight Without a Reason" – 2:47
 "Adónde" – 3:58

Personnel
Musicians
 Javier Revilla-Diez – voice, words
 Chris Demere – synthesizers and keyboards
 Torsten Engelke – synthesizers
 Stefan Engelke – synthesizers
Production
 Recorded and mixed at Hansa Tonstudio, Berlin, except "Situations", "Have in Mind" and "Quién Lo Sabía?", recorded at Studio M, Hannover, by Jan Nemec, remixed at Hansa Tonstudio, Berlin
 Produced by Cetu Javu & Matthias Härtl
 Engineered by Matthias Härtl
 Assistant Engineers: Shannon Strong, A. Moses Schneider and Alex Leser
 Cover: Bart E. Streefkerk

References

1990 debut albums
Cetu Javu albums
ZYX Music albums